Tropical Storm Julio was a tropical storm that made landfall on the southern tip of Baja California Sur in August 2008. The tenth named storm of the 2008 Pacific hurricane season, it developed from a tropical wave on August 23 off the coast of Mexico. It moved parallel to the coast, reaching peak winds of 50 mph (85 km/h) before moving ashore and weakening. On August 26 it dissipated in the Gulf of California. Julio was the third tropical cyclone to make landfall in the Pacific Ocean basin during the season, after Tropical Storm Alma, which struck Nicaragua in May, and Tropical Depression Five-E, which moved ashore along southwestern Mexico in July. The storm brought locally heavy rainfall to southern Baja California, killing one person and leaving several towns isolated. Moisture from Julio reached Arizona, producing thunderstorms, including one which damaged ten small planes in Chandler.

Meteorological history

On August 20, a tropical wave became discernible about 800 miles (1300 km) off the coast of Mexico, which in the next day developed a large area of convection, or thunderstorms. Initially, conditions were unfavorable for development, due to strong upper-level wind shear. Tracking northwestward parallel to the Mexican coast, the system became better organized on August 22, though later that day its structure deteriorated. On August 23, a strong area of convection developed and persisted near a circulation center, despite strong wind shear. With banding features becoming more prominent, the National Hurricane Center (NHC) classified the system as Tropical Depression Eleven-E about 345 miles (555 km) south-southeast of the southern tip of the Baja California Peninsula.

The tropical depression initially moved northwestward around the southwestern periphery of a ridge over Mexico. Convection continued to develop to the west of the center, and late on August 23, a ship report confirmed the depression intensified Tropical Storm Julio. Initially, the persistent shear left the center partially exposed from the thunderstorm activity, though upper level conditions gradually became more favorable for strengthening. On August 24, Tropical Storm Julio attained peak winds of 50 mph (85 km/h) as intense convection developed near the center. Shortly thereafter, the center became difficult to locate, and late on August 24 the storm moved ashore along the southwestern coast of the Baja California Peninsula.

Tropical Storm Julio quickly weakened over land, although it initially maintained strong convection near its center. By early on August 26, however, the low-level and upper-level circulations separated, with the upper-circulation continuing quickly northeastward into mainland Mexico; the low-level circulation slowed as it entered the Gulf of California, after having been separated from its deep convection. Later in the day, the NHC discontinued advisories after the storm failed to maintain enough organized convection to be considered a tropical cyclone. The remnants of Julio were absorbed by a thermal low over the Mojave Desert on August 27.

Preparations and impact

Shortly before it was named, the government of Mexico issued a tropical storm watch in the state of Baja California Sur, from Santa Fe on the Pacific coast around the peninsula to Buenavista along the Gulf of California. About 24 hours prior to landfall, the watch was replaced with a warning from Santa Fe to San Evaristo, and the tropical storm watch was extended along both sides of the peninsula. Prior to it making landfall, more than 2,500 families in susceptible areas left their homes. Officials opened several shelters in the area where the storm struck.

As Julio made landfall, it produced lightning and locally heavy rainfall, which left more than a dozen communities isolated due to flooding. The flooding damaged several houses and killed two people. Winds were generally light, although strong enough to damage a few electrical poles and small buildings. In nearby Sinaloa, rainfall from the storm led to an emergency evacuation of 500 residents.

Moisture from Julio developed thunderstorms across Arizona, including one near Chandler which produced winds of 75 mph (120 km/h); the storm damaged ten small planes at Chandler Municipal Airport, as well as a hangar. The damages at the airport were estimated at $1 million (USD). The storms also dropped heavy rainfall, reaching over 1 inch (25 mm) in Gilbert, which caused flooding on Interstate 17.

On August 25, 2008, moisture from the remnants of Julio caused minor flooding in parts of the south-western region of the United States.

See also

List of Pacific hurricanes
Other tropical cyclones named Julio
Timeline of the 2008 Pacific hurricane season

References

Julio
Julio (2008)
2008 in Mexico
Julio
Julio